Ravenna railway station serves the city and comune of Ravenna, in the region of Emilia-Romagna, northern Italy.  Opened in 1863, it forms part of the Ferrara–Rimini railway, and is also a terminus of two secondary railways, linking Ravenna with Faenza and Castelbolognese, respectively.

The station is currently managed by Rete Ferroviaria Italiana (RFI).  However, the commercial area of the passenger building is managed by Centostazioni.  Train services are operated by Trenitalia. Each of these companies is a subsidiary of Ferrovie dello Stato (FS), Italy's state-owned rail company.

Location
Ravenna railway station is situated at Piazza Luigi Carlo Farini, on the eastern side of the city centre.

History
The station was opened on 23 August 1863, together with the rest of the Castelbolognese–Ravenna railway. Normal passenger services on that railway commenced the following day, 24 August 1863.

Train services

Passenger movements
The station has about 3.5 million passenger movements each year.

Regional passenger services
The station is served by regional trains operating on the three railway lines:

to Ferrara and Rimini, on the Ferrara–Ravenna–Rimini line;
to Bologna Centrale, via the Castelbolognese line;
to Faenza, terminus of the Faenza line.

The latter two lines run parallel as far as Russi.

Long-distance passenger services
Periodically, mainly in summer, Ravenna has long-distance passenger services, and in the past these have included international trains.

Eurostar Fast Rome–Ravenna. operates daily.
InterCityNotte Trieste–Lecce. Operates daily, with some exceptions.
The following links, however, are operated seasonally:

Eurostar City Milano Centrale–Ravenna–Ancona. Runs on summer Saturdays and holidays.
Eurostar Rome–Ravenna. Runs daily in summer.

Goods services
Given its proximity to the port, the station is the main hub for transporting goods to Melzo Scalo and Quadrante Europa.

See also

History of rail transport in Italy
List of railway stations in Emilia-Romagna
Rail transport in Italy
Railway stations in Italy

References

External links

 

Railway Station
Railway stations in Emilia-Romagna
Railway stations opened in 1863